Anyways may refer to:

 Anyways (album) or the title song, by Young Nudy, 2020
 Anyways (EP) or the title song, by the Starting Line, 2016
 "Anyways", a song by Arctic Monkeys from Tranquility Base Hotel & Casino, 2018

See also 
 Anyway (disambiguation)